The Man with Rain in His Shoes is a 1998 Spanish-British romantic comedy film, written by Spanish singer-songwriter Rafa Russo, directed by Spanish filmmaker María Ripoll (in her directing debut) and starring Lena Headey, Douglas Henshall, Penélope Cruz, Mark Strong and Elizabeth McGovern with Paul Popplewell. The film was released under the titles Twice Upon a Yesterday in the United States and If Only... in France, the United Kingdom, and Australia.

Plot 
Victor (Henshall) is an actor in London who is desperate to stop his ex-girlfriend, Sylvia (Headey), to whom he was unfaithful, from marrying another man. After meeting two mysterious dustmen, he is given the chance to travel back in time and relive his romance. However, he finds that things develop differently this time around—Sylvia has an affair with Dave (Strong), and she leaves him.

Cast 
 Douglas Henshall as Victor Bukowski
 Lena Headey as Sylvia Weld
 Penélope Cruz as Louise
 Charlotte Coleman as Alison Hayes
 Mark Strong as Dave Summers
 Neil Stuke as Freddy
 Elizabeth McGovern as Diane
 Inday Ba as Janice
 Paul Popplewell as Simon
 Antonio Gil as Director
 Gustavo Salmerón as Rafael
 Eusebio Lázaro as Don Miguel

Soundtrack 
The soundtrack features songs performed by Alpha Blondy, Nigel and Lewis, Salif Keita, and Susana Martins. The film's writer Rafa Russo also performs his own composition "Friends Are Friends".

Awards 
The film won Best Screenplay 1998 at the Montreal World Film Festival, the Gran Angular Award 1998 at the Sitges - Catalan International Film Festival and the Bronze Precolumbian Circle at the 1999 Bogota Film Festival.

See also
 List of films featuring time loops

References

External links 
 
 
 

1998 romantic comedy films
1998 films
British romantic comedy films
British fantasy comedy films
Spanish romantic comedy films
1998 directorial debut films
Time loop films
1990s English-language films
1990s British films
Spanish fantasy comedy films
1990s Spanish films